Archibald or Archie White may refer to:

Sir Archibald White, 4th Baronet (1877–1945), English amateur first-class cricketer
Archibald White (umpire) (1871–1920), Test match cricket umpire
Archie Cecil Thomas White (1890–1971), English recipient of the Victoria Cross
Archie White (rugby union) (born 1997), English rugby union player

See also
Archie Whyte (1919–1973), Scottish footballer